3-Deoxy-D-pentulosonic acid aldolase may refer to:
 2-dehydro-3-deoxy-D-pentonate aldolase, an enzyme
 2-dehydro-3-deoxy-L-pentonate aldolase, an enzyme